Silvia Díaz Acosta (born 1987) is a Chilean politician who currently serves as minister of science, technology, knowledge and innovation.

Biography
She studied at the Colegio Santa María in Ovalle between the 3rd grade of elementary school until she graduated from high school.

She has a doctorate in Chemistry from the Pontifical Catholic University of Chile, graduated in 2015. Between 2018 and 2022 she served as deputy director and scientific director of the Fundación Encuentros del Futuro, entity in charge of Congreso Futuro.

Political career
It is an independent close to the Party for Democracy (PPD).

She was appointed as Minister of Science, Technology, Knowledge and Innovation by President Gabriel Boric on September 6, 2022, replacing Flavio Salazar. She is the first woman to hold the position since the creation of the ministry in 2018.

References

1987 births
Living people
Pontifical Catholic University of Chile alumni
Party for Democracy (Chile) politicians
21st-century Chilean politicians
Government ministers of Chile